Aonach Mòr is a mountain in the Scottish Highlands.

The name Aonach Mòr (big ridge) might suggest that the mountain is taller than its close neighbour to the south, Aonach Beag (small ridge) to which it is linked by a high bealach. However, the names refer to the relative bulk of the mountains when seen from the glen, rather than their elevation; the summit of Aonach Mòr is  lower than the summit of Aonach Beag.

More traditionally, the mountain is often climbed from the south from Glen Nevis and in conjunction with Aonach Beag.

Climate 
The summit of Aonach Mòr has tundra climate (ET climate in the Köppen classification). The tree line of the mountain - as with most of highland Scotland - is found at approximately 500 metres (1,600 feet) and above this only stunted tree specimens may be found. Sheltered Coires on the mountain can hold snow throughout the year and this snow can persist from one winter till the next.

Nevis Range Ski Area 

The Nevis Range alpine ski area is located on the mountain's northern and eastern slopes. The ski area was opened in 1989.  A gondola lift and several chairlifts and ski tows provide access to 54 runs.

These include Scotland's highest pistes and best off piste backcountry skiing itineraries in the back corries of Coire Dubh, Coire an Lochan, Summit Coire and the West Face.

The ski area's name was originally eponymous with the mountain, but later appropriated the name "Nevis" from the mountain's more famous neighbour Ben Nevis. The change sparked some controversy. Whilst Nevis is no doubt easier to pronounce than Aonach Mòr for non-Scottish Gaelic speakers, it was considered by some to represent an erasure of an indigenous name.

Nevis Range Downhill Mountain Bike Track 
In summer the gondola is used for access to the top of the downhill mountain biking tracks. The Nevis Range resort has hosted the Mountain Bike World Cup thirteen times (2002, 2003, 2004, 2005, 2006, 2008, 2009, 2010, 2011, 2012, 2013, 2014, 2015, 2016, 2017, 2018), and hosted the Mountain Bike World Championships in 2007.

The gondola is also used by paragliders to reach launching points.

See also
 Ben Nevis
 List of Munro mountains
 Mountains and hills of Scotland

References 

Ski areas and resorts in Scotland
Munros
Mountains and hills of the Central Highlands
Mountain biking venues in the United Kingdom
Protected areas of Highland (council area)
One-thousanders of Scotland
Gondola lifts in the United Kingdom